Carroll Parrott Blue (August 23, 1943 – December 11, 2019) was an American filmmaker, director and author. Based in Houston, Texas, she was part of the L.A. Rebellion film movement. She was noted for her documentary film and interactive multimedia works, particularly for her project The Dawn at My Back: Memoir of a Black Texas Upbringing. Blue was a research professor at the University of Houston. She worked to preserve and celebrate the history of the African American community in Houston.

Early life and education
Carroll Parrott Blue was born on August 23, 1943 in Houston, Texas. She grew up during the segregation era in Houston's Third Ward. During her childhood, Blue's mother Mollie Carroll Parrott worked with and for organizations such as Negro YWCA, Garden Club, Texas Negro Democratic party, and many church groups that fought for civil rights during the Civil Rights Era. Blue graduated from Jack Yates Colored High School.

Blue began attending Boston University in 1960 and earned her B.A. in english literature in 1964. She earned her MFA in film production at the University of California, Los Angeles in 1980.

Career 
Blue's documentary works have focused on women of the African diaspora and visual arts themes. Blue's multimedia participatory projects developed out of her documentary work. Her autobiographical The Dawn at my Back, a work that combines film, text and hypermedia form, gave rise to the non-profit organization The Dawn Project and later to Third Ward Storymapping.

Her work is heavily concentrated in documentaries, African American cinema and digital community-based media. Blue was also involved in television. Her television programs include Varnette's World: A Study of a Young Artist (1979), Smithsonian World ("Nigerian Arts-Kindred Spirits," 1996) and NOVA ("Mystery of the Senses: Vision," 2007).

Blue was part of the L.A. Rebellion filmmaking movement (1967-1989), alongside Julie Dash, Charles Burnett, Jamaa Fanaka, Haile Gerima, Billy Woodberry, Barbara McCullough, Ben Caldwell, Alile Sharon Larkin, and Larry Clark. The L.A. Rebellion filmmakers worked against Hollywood's negative perspective of black people in starring realistic, anti-stereotype characters in their works. Filming African Americans in their communities was an important aspect of this work, as Zeinabu Irene Davis stated in 2014 the "goal was and is to represent, reflect on, and enrich the day-to-day lives of people in our own communities."

Blue became a professor emerita of San Diego State University in 1980.

Blue's documentary Conversations with Roy DeCarava (1983) is a highly respected piece in the Los Angeles School. This documentary looks at DeCarava's work and life in Harlem. She also created a documentary about Ghanaian sculptor El Anatsui which helped to launch his career. She served as a producer fellow for the American Film Institute in 1984 and 1985.

The Dawn at My Back: A Memoir of a Black Texas Upbringing, (2003) is a book, DVD-ROM and website. It explores Blue's family history and the history of Houston's black community. It won the Sundance Online Film Festival Jury Award in 2004 and was also named one of the 30 best American Association of University Press publications by the American Library Association in that year.

From 2006 through 2015, Blue was a research professor at the University of Houston. While at the University of Houston, she applied for a National Endowment for the Arts "Our Town" grant application to encourage people in the art and architecture field to improve the community. She was awarded $100,000 for this pursuit. In 2011 and 2012 she was appointed a visiting scholar at the Harvard Graduate School of Design.

Blue was passionate about transforming Houston and founded SEHTA, the Southeast Houston Transformation Alliance. In Blue's pursuit of making change in the Southeast Houston area, her work consisted of storytelling, interactive multimedia, public art and design. SEHTA tells the community's story by capturing the voices from the community while merging the objective facts of this community to reach her audience of academics, developers and donors. She was part of a team that created artwork at the Palm Center Transit Center and worked towards the renovation of Houston's Emancipation Park.

Shortly after Hurricane Harvey in 2017, Blue collaborated in the creation of a storymap for the Third Ward with The Dawn Project, the Houston Chronicle, and several other organizations. The project collected stories from Houston residents who were impacted by storm.

Awards 
Blue's work The Dawn at My Back: Memoir of a Texas Upbringing won the 2004 Sundance Online Film Festival Viewers Award in the New Forms Gallery category.

She was appointed a World Academy of Art and Science Fellow in 2007.

Death 
Blue died on December 11, 2019, as reported in the Houston Defender. Her cause of death is unknown.

Selected filmography
Carroll Parrott Blue has produced, directed and written films including those listed in the table below:

Selected publications
In Blue's work as an author she blends text with graphics and stills.

Blue's poem titled Sometimes a poem is Twenty Years of Memory: 1967-1987, showcases a few of her experiences early and throughout her career within those years. It explores how the interaction of her race, gender and community interact with her work in the film industry. It details good and bad experiences throughout.

References

External links
 Mapping the Third Ward in Houston Story Work in the Face of Redevelopment

African-American contemporary artists
American contemporary artists
African-American film directors
American multimedia artists
1943 births
2019 deaths
African-American women artists
American women film directors
L.A. Rebellion
UCLA Film School alumni
Artists from Texas
People from Houston
20th-century American women artists
21st-century American women artists
Film directors from Texas
20th-century African-American women
20th-century African-American people
20th-century African-American artists
21st-century African-American women
21st-century African-American artists